James Ryan (born 7 April 1987) is an Irish hurler who plays as a centre-forward for the Limerick senior teams.

Born in Garryspillane, County Limerick, Ryan arrived on the inter-county scene at the age of eighteen when he first linked up with the Limerick minor hurling team, before later lining out with the under-21 side. He made his senior debut in the 2008 National Hurling League. Ryan has since gone on to play a key part for Limerick, and has won one Munster medal and one National League (Division 2) medal. He was also a regular member of the Limerick Gaelic football team for a number of seasons.

Ryan was named as the Man of the Match in 2013 Munster Senior Hurling Championship Final as Limerick defeated Cork by 0–24 to 0–15 with Ryan scoring three points during the game.

At club level Ryan has won one championship medal with Garryspillane.

Honours
Inter-county
 Munster Senior Hurling Championship (1): 2013

References 

1987 births
Living people
Dual players
Garryspillane hurlers
Limerick inter-county hurlers